"I (Who Have Nothing)" (sometimes billed as "I Who Have Nothing") is an English language cover of the Italian song "Uno dei Tanti" (English: "One of Many"), with music by Carlo Donida and lyrics by Giulio "Mogol" Rapetti. The initial version, "Uno dei Tanti", was performed by Joe Sentieri in 1961.

The song first recorded in English by Ben E. King in 1963 with new lyrics by Jerry Leiber and Mike Stoller.  Other successful cover versions were released by Shirley Bassey and Tom Jones, also by Status Quo.

Ben E. King version

The English lyrics for "I (Who Have Nothing)" were written by Jerry Leiber and Mike Stoller. The title is a translation of a line in the Italian lyrics "Io, che non ho niente", but otherwise the English lyrics were written afresh by the lyricists. Leiber and Stoller also produced the first English language release, performed by Ben E. King in 1963. Leiber and Stoller previously had co-written and produced the song "Stand by Me" with Ben E. King in 1961. The record used the same arrangement from Joe Sentieri's record (orchestra conducted by Luis Enriquez Bacalov).

In the US, the Ben E. King version reached No. 29 on the Billboard Hot 100 charts and No. 16 on the Hot R&B Singles chart.

Charts

Shirley Bassey Version

Shirley Bassey recorded the song with producer George Martin as the song by Ben E. King was rising in the chart in the US, and released the song in the UK in September 1963. Her version reached No. 6 on UK charts. Bassey has performed the song at almost every live concert she gave, and it is included in many of her compilation albums, such as a version in I Am What I Am recorded with the London Symphony Orchestra, and a version in Spanish  ("Hoy No Tengo Nada") in her 1989 album La Mujer. She has also performed with the song's composer Donida who conducted his own music on Italian television.

Charts

Tom Jones version
Tom Jones recorded a version which was released in 1970. The song is the title track of his album I Who Have Nothing. This became the most popular version of the song in the United States, peaking at No. 14 in 1970 on the Billboard Hot 100, No. 2 on the Easy Listening chart, and No. 10 in Canada. This version also peaked at No. 11 in Cashbox.

Charts

Sylvester version

Sylvester recorded a disco version in 1979. The orchestral arrangement for the song was recorded at Island Records' Basing Street Studios. This version reached No. 40 in US and No. 86 Canada.

Charts

Other versions

Other versions which reached the Billboard charts were performed by Terry Knight and the Pack in 1966 (No. 46 US, No. 36 Canada), Liquid Smoke in 1970 (No. 82 US, No. 66 Canada), Warhorse in 1972.

British rock band The Spectres, later known as Status Quo, released their version of the song produced by John Schroeder in September 1966 as a single on Piccadilly Records. This would be their debut single, nearly a year before changing their name and finding their way to mainstream popularity. The single, however, failed to chart.

Swedish pop group Tom & Mick & Maniacs recorded the song sporadically between 5–7 and 15 October 1967 at Europafilm Studio in Bromma, Stockholm together with producer Anders Henriksson. In December of that year, it was released on their album Tom & Mick Maniacs, and in February 1968, it was extracted as a single on Columbia Records, backed by "Pandemonium", an original composition. It reached No. 8 on Tio i Topp, becoming their final chart hit.

References 

1963 singles
1966 singles
1970 singles
1979 singles
Ben E. King songs
Shirley Bassey songs
Sylvester (singer) songs
Songs written by Jerry Leiber and Mike Stoller
Songs written by Mogol (lyricist)
Song recordings produced by George Martin
Torch songs
Disco songs
1963 songs
Atco Records singles
Songs written by Carlo Donida

it:Uno dei tanti/Cara cara